Lerkendal is a borough in the city of Trondheim in Trøndelag county, Norway.  The borough was established on 1 January 2005 in a municipal borough reform that reduced the number of boroughs in the city.  The borough of Østbyen lies to the east, Midtbyen lies to the northwest, and Heimdal lies to the southwest.  The boroughs oversee health, welfare, and education for their residents.

The borough is located south of Gløshaugen and Elgeseter, west of Berg, north of Tempe and mostly east of the river Nidelva. The area is dominated by the Norwegian University of Science and Technology, SINTEF, and Lerkendal Stadion (the home stadium of Rosenborg).  The area also has a railway line, Stavne–Leangen Line, running through it with one station, Lerkendal Station, that is served by the local tran service Trøndelag Commuter Rail.  The borough of Lerkendal consists of the neighborhoods and villages of Bratsberg, Dragvoll, Elgeseter, Flatåsen, Gløshaugen, Lerkendal, Moholt, Nardo, Risvollan, Sjetnemarka, Valentinlyst, Fossegrenda and Åsvang.

See also
List of boroughs in Trondheim prior to 2005

References

External links
Map of the boroughs of Trondheim 

Geography of Trondheim